Grinder Rock is the southernmost of a group of rocks extending from the southeast end of Intercurrence Island, in the Palmer Archipelago, Antarctica. It was shown on Argentine and Chilean government charts of 1957. The name, given by the UK Antarctic Place-Names Committee in 1960, is descriptive of this toothlike feature.

References

Rock formations of the Palmer Archipelago